Dalmore Reserve is a small reserve in the suburb of Dalmore in Dunedin. It is managed by Dunedin City Council who purchased the land in 1990 from the Dominican Order. The 6-hectare reserve is primarily lowland native forest and features a community garden and walking tracks.

History 
In October 2016, local residents established a community garden. It was officially opened by Mayor Dave Cull and Councillor Jinty MacTavish.

Flora and fauna 
The reserve is predominantly lowland native forest and is classified as an Urban Biodiversity Mapped Area in Dunedin City Council's Second Generation District Plan.

References 

Nature reserves in New Zealand
Geography of Dunedin